Maria Hayward is an English historian of costume and early modern Britain.

She is a professor of history at the University of Southampton and has published a number of works on the courts of Tudor and Stuart monarchs.

Selected publications
 Stuart style: monarchy, dress and the Scottish male elite, (Yale University Press, 2020).
 The Great Wardrobe Accounts of Henry VII and Henry VIII, (London Record Society, 2012).
 Rich Apparel: Clothing and the Law Henry VIII's England, (Ashgate, 2009).
 Dress at the Court of King Henry VIII (Maney, 2007).
 The 1542 Inventory of Whitehall: the palace and its keeper, vols 1 & 2 (Society of Antiquaries of London, 2004).

References

Living people
Year of birth missing (living people)
British women historians
Academics of the University of Southampton